Patryk Kuchczyński (born 17 March 1983) is a former Polish team handball player.

He received a silver medal with the Polish team at the 2007 World Men's Handball Championship, he was also part of the Polish squad, which won bronze medal at the 2009 World Men's Handball Championship. Position - Left Forward (winger).

References

External links
 Player profile on Polish Handball Association  website
 Profile at Vive Targi Kielce official website

1983 births
Living people
Polish male handball players
Sportspeople from Gdynia
Vive Kielce players
21st-century Polish people